Mihailo Vukdragović (November 8, 1900 – March 3, 1967) was a Serbian composer and conductor, Professor at the Belgrade Music Academy (later named Faculty of Music in Belgrade), Rector of the University of Arts in Belgrade and member of the Serbian Academy of Sciences and Arts.

External links
 Biography of Mihailo Vukdragović
Mihajlo Vukdragović as a Rector of the University of Arts in Belgrade 
Faculty of Music in Belgrade

Serbian composers
Serbian conductors (music)
Academic staff of the University of Arts in Belgrade
Members of the Serbian Academy of Sciences and Arts
1900 births
1967 deaths
20th-century composers
20th-century conductors (music)
Rectors of the University of Arts in Belgrade